Kennedy Boboye (born 1 January 1974) is a Nigerian football manager and former player.

Playing career
Boboye started his career with Nigerian second tier side Sharks.
In 1998, he signed for SV Straelen in the German fourth tier. In 1999, he signed for German third tier club KFC Uerdingen. In 2003, he signed for Manning Rangers in South Africa.

Managerial career
In 2016, Boboye was appointed manager of Nigerian team Plateau United, helping them win their only top flight title. In 2019, he was appointed manager of Akwa United in Nigeria, helping them win their only top flight title.

References

External links
 

Living people
1974 births
Association football forwards
Nigerian footballers
Regionalliga players
Manning Rangers F.C. players
Sharks F.C. players
SV 19 Straelen players
KFC Uerdingen 05 players
Nigerian football managers
Akwa United F.C. managers
Sunshine Stars F.C. managers
Nigerian expatriate footballers
Nigerian expatriate sportspeople in South Africa
Expatriate soccer players in South Africa
Nigerian expatriate sportspeople in Germany
Expatriate footballers in Germany